Henrietta d'Auverquerque, Countess of Grantham (died 11 October 1724), formerly Lady Henrietta Butler, was an English noblewoman and the wife of Henry de Nassau d'Auverquerque, 1st Earl of Grantham.

History 
Henrietta was the youngest daughter of Thomas Butler, 6th Earl of Ossory, and a sister of James Butler, 2nd Duke of Ormonde, a well-known Jacobite nobleman. Her mother, Emilia, was a Dutch noblewoman; Henrietta was thus a first cousin of her husband, whose father was Emilia's brother. They were married on 12 January 1697 and had the following issue:
Henry (1697–1718), styled Viscount Boston
Thomas (1700–1730), styled Viscount Boston, who died unmarried.
 Lady Frances de Nassau d'Auverquerque (died 1772), who married Captain (later Lieutenant-Colonel) William Elliot of Wells, and had one child who died in infancy
 Emilia Mary (c.1702–1712)  
 Lady Henrietta de Nassau d'Auverquerque (1712–1747), who married William Clavering-Cowper, 2nd Earl Cowper, and was the mother of George Clavering-Cowper, 3rd Earl Cowper

From 1718 until her death in 1724, the countess was a Lady of the Bedchamber to Caroline of Ansbach, then Princess of Wales.

References

1724 deaths
Butler dynasty
English countesses
English people of Dutch descent
Daughters of Irish earls
House of Orange-Nassau
Ladies of the Bedchamber
Court of George I of Great Britain
Household of Caroline of Brandenburg-Ansbach